Elgin is a town (former cathedral city) and formerly a Royal Burgh in Moray, Scotland. It is the administrative and commercial centre for Moray. The town originated to the south of the River Lossie on the higher ground above the floodplain where the town of Birnie is. There, the church of Birnie Kirk was built in 1140 and serves the community to this day.

Elgin is first documented in the Cartulary of Moray in 1190 AD. It was created a royal burgh in the 12th century by King David I of Scotland, and by that time had a castle on top of the present-day Lady Hill to the west of the town. The origin of the name Elgin is likely to be Celtic. It may derive from 'Aille' literally signifying beauty, but in topography a beautiful place or valley. Another possibility is 'ealg', meaning both 'Ireland' and 'worthy'. The termination 'gin' or 'in' are Celtic endings signifying little or diminutive forms, hence Elgin could mean beautiful place, worthy place or little Ireland.

History

The discovery of the Elgin Pillar, a 9th-century class II Pictish stone, under the High Street in 1823 suggests there may have been an Early Christian presence in the area of the later market, but there is no further evidence of activity before Elgin was created a Royal Burgh in the 12th century. In August 1040, MacBeth's army defeated and killed Duncan I at Bothganowan (Pitgaveny), near Elgin. Elgin is first recorded in a charter of David I in 1151 in which he granted an annuity to the Priory of Urquhart. David had made Elgin a royal burgh around 1130, after his defeat of Óengus of Moray. During David's reign, the castle was established at the top of what is now Lady Hill. The town received a royal charter from Alexander II in 1224 when he granted the land for a new cathedral to Andrew, Bishop of Moray. This finally settled the episcopal see which had been at various times at Kinneddar, Birnie and Spynie. The ancient Forest of Darnaway was designated a Royal Forest and was used by the Scottish kings for hunting.

Alexander II was Elgin's greatest benefactor and returned many times to his royal castle. He established the two religious houses of the town, the Dominicans or Blackfriars on the west side and the Franciscans or Greyfriars in the east. Further to the east stood the Hospital of Maison Dieu, or House of God also founded during the reign of Alexander II for the reception of poor men and women.

On 19 July 1224, the foundation stone of the new Elgin Cathedral was ceremoniously laid. The cathedral was completed sometime after 1242 but was completely destroyed by fire in 1270. The reasons for this are unrecorded. The buildings now remain as ruins date from the reconstruction following that fire. The Chartulary of Moray described the completed cathedral as "Mirror of the country and the glory of the kingdom".

Edward I of England travelled twice to Elgin. During his first visit in 1296, he was impressed by what he saw. Preserved in the Cotton library now held in the British Library is the journal of his stay, describing the castle and the town of Elgin as "bon chastell et bonne ville"—good castle and good town. By his second visit in September 1303, the castle's wooden interior had been burned while held by the English governor, Henry de Rye. As a result, he only stayed in Elgin for two days and then camped at Kinloss Abbey from 13 September until 4 October. King Edward was furious when David de Moravia, Bishop of Moray, joined Scotland's cause with Bruce, and Edward appealed to the Pope who excommunicated the bishop, thus removing papal protection, causing him to flee to Orkney, then to Norway, only to return after Robert Bruce's victories against the English. After Edward's death in July 1307, Robert the Bruce attacked Elgin and then retook Scotland in 1308.

In August 1370 Alexander Bur, Bishop of Moray began payments to Alexander Stewart, Wolf of Badenoch, King Robert III's brother, for the protection of his lands and men. In February 1390, the bishop then turned to Thomas Dunbar, son of the Earl of Moray, to provide the protection. This action infuriated Stewart and in May he descended from his castle on an island in Lochindorb and burned the town of Forres in revenge. In June he burned much of Elgin, including two monasteries, St Giles Church, the Hospital of Maison Dieu and the cathedral. Andrew of Wyntoun's Orygynale Cronykil of Scotland (a 15th-century history of Scotland) described this action by "wyld, wykked Heland-men". The rebuilding of the cathedral took many years; but much of it has since crumbled away due to the inferior quality of the stone made available to the 15th- and 16th-century masons, while the 13th-century construction still remains. In 1506, the great central tower collapsed and although rebuilding work began the next year it was not completed till 1538.

From the Reformation to the eighteenth century

The citizens of Elgin and surrounding areas did not seem to object to the new religion following the Reformation. In 1568 the lead was stripped from the roof of the cathedral, by order of the Privy Council of Scotland. The lead was sold to William Birnie and Alexander Clark. The proceeds went to the maintenance of Regent Moray's soldiers, but the ship taking the lead cargo to Holland sank almost immediately on leaving Aberdeen harbour. Without this protection, the building began to deteriorate. 

The Kirk Session records of Elgin name women who danced at New Year 1623 to the sound of a trumpet. Six men, described as guisers or "gwysseris" performed a sword dance wearing masks and visors covering their faces in the churchyard and in the courtyard of a house. They were fined 40 shillings each. The fabric of the Cathedral continued to deteriorate. In 1637, the rafters over the choir were blown down and in 1640 the minister of St Giles along with the Laird of Innes and Alexander Brodie of Brodie, all ardent Covenanters, removed and destroyed the ornately carved screen and woodwork that had remained intact. The tracery of the West window was destroyed sometime between 1650 and 1660 by Cromwell's soldiers. On Easter Sunday 1711 the central tower collapsed for the second time in its history but caused much more damage. The rubble was quarried for various projects in the vicinity until 1807 when, through the efforts of Joseph King of Newmill, a wall was built around the cathedral and a keeper's house erected. Mountains of this rubble were cleared by one John Shanks, enabling visitors to view the ornate stonemasonry. Shanks was presented with an ornate snuffbox by the authorities; it is now in Elgin Museum.

When Daniel Defoe toured Scotland in 1717, he visited Elgin and said:In this rich country is the city, or town rather, of Elgin; I say city, because in antient time the monks claim'd it for a city; and the cathedral shews, by its ruins, that it was a place of great magnificence. Nor must it be wonder'd at, if in so pleasant, so rich, and so agreeable a part of the country, all the rest being so differing from it, the clergy should seat themselves in a proportion'd number, seeing we must do them the justice to say, that if there is any place richer and more fruitful, and pleasant than another, they seldom fail to find it out. As the country is rich and pleasant, so here are a great many rich inhabitants, and in the town of Elgin in particular; for the gentlemen, as if this was the Edinburgh, or the court, for this part of the island, leave their Highland habitations in the winter and come and live here for the diversion of the place and plenty of provisions; and there is, on this account, a great variety of gentlemen for society, and that of all parties and of all opinions. This makes Elgin a very agreeable place to live in, notwithstanding its distance, being above 450 measur'd miles [725 km] from London, and more, if we must go by Edinburgh.

The cathedral is known as the Lantern of the North. When Bishop Bur wrote to King Robert III, complaining of the wanton destruction done to the building by the King's brother, the Wolf of Badenoch, he describes the cathedral as "the ornament of this district, the glory of the kingdom and the admiration of foreigners." Chambers, in his Picture of Scotland, says: It is an allowed fact, which the ruins seem still to attest, that this was by far the most splendid specimen of ecclesiastical architecture in Scotland, the abbey church of Melrose not excepted. It must be acknowledged that the edifice last mentioned is a wonderful instance of symmetry and elaborate decoration; yet in extent, in loftiness, in impressive magnificence, and even in minute decoration, Elgin has been manifestly superior. Enough still remains to impress the solitary traveller with a sense of admiration mixed with astonishment.

Lachlan Shaw in his History of the Province of Moray was equally impressed when he wrotethe church when entire was a building of Gothic architecture inferior to few in Europe.

Prince Charles Edward Stuart travelled to Elgin from Inverness in March 1746 and, falling ill with a feverish cold, stayed for 11 days before returning to await the arrival of the king's army. He stayed in Elgin with Mrs Anderson, a passionate Jacobite, at Thunderton House. She kept the sheets that the Prince slept on and was buried in them a quarter of a century later. The Duke of Cumberland passed through the town on 13 April, camping at Alves on the way to meet the Prince in battle on Drummossie Muir. After the battle, William Boyd, 4th Earl of Kilmarnock, one of the Prince's generals, was captured and taken to London and eventual execution, but he wrote to his friend from prison about his indebtedness to the shoemakers of Elgin: Beside my personal debts mentioned in general and particular in the State, there is one for which I am liable in justice, if it is not paid, owing to poor people who gave their work for it by my orders. It was at Elgin in Murray, the Regiment I commanded wanted shoes. I commissioned something about seventy pair of shoes and brogues, which might come to 3 shillngs or three shillings and sixpence each, one with the other. The magistrates divided them among the shoemakers of the town and country, and each shoemaker furnished his proportion. I drew on the town, for the price, out of the composition laid on them, but I was afterwards told at Inverness that, it was believed, the composition was otherwise applied, and the poor shoemakers not paid. As these poor people wrought by my orders, it will be a great ease to my heart to think they are not to lose by me, as too many have done in the course of that year, but had I lived I might have made some inquiry after but now it is impossible, as their hardships in loss of horses and such things, which happeened through my soldiers, are so interwoven with what was done by other people, that it would be very hard, if not impossible, to separate them. If you'll write to Mr Innes of Dalkinty at Elgin (with whom I was quartered when I lay there), he will send you an account of the shoes, and if they were paid to the shoemakers or no; and if they are not, I beg you'll get my wife, or my successors to pay them when they can...

Nineteenth century

In the 19th century, the old medieval town of Elgin was swept away. The first major addition to the town centre was the Assembly Rooms, built in 1821 by the Trinity Lodge of Freemasons, at the corner of High Street and North Street. In 1819, Dr Gray's Hospital was built on unused ground. The building has imposing columns and distinctive dome. Dr Alexander Gray, a doctor who worked for and made his fortune with the East India Company, endowed £26,000 for the hospital. In 1828 the new parish church of St Giles was built at a cost of £10,000. L. General Andrew Anderson, born in Elgin, also of the East India Company, died in 1824 and bequeathed £70,000 to the town to found an institution for the welfare of the elderly poor and for the education of orphans. The Anderson Institution was built in the east end of the town in 1832 with accommodation for 50 children and ten elderly people. The Burgh Court House was built in 1841, the museum was completed in 1842 and Elgin Sheriff Court was built in 1866.

The Morayshire Railway was officially opened in ceremonies at Elgin and Lossiemouth on 10 August 1852, the steam engines having been delivered to Lossiemouth by sea. It was the first railway north of Aberdeen and initially ran only  between Elgin and Lossiemouth. It was later extended south to Craigellachie. The Great North of Scotland Railway took over the working of the line in 1863 and bought the company in 1881 following the Morayshire Railway's return to solvency from crippling debt.

The town was becoming prosperous, and by 1882 it had a Head Post Office with a savings bank, insurance and telegraph departments, and branches of the Bank of Scotland and the British Linen Company, Caledonian, Commercial, North of Scotland, Royal and Union Banks, and the National Securities Savings Bank, offices or agencies of 48 insurance companies, five hotels, and a newspaper.

The Cooper Park drill hall was completed in 1908.

The war memorial in Elgin dates from 1921 and represents "Peace and Victory". It was designed by Percy Portsmouth.

Geography and geology
The modern town straddles the River Lossie, with the suburbs of Bishopmill to the north and New Elgin to the south. Permo–Triassic rocks, rare in Scotland, are commonly found around Elgin. These are composed of aeolian sandstone formed when this area was subjected to desert conditions. Quarry Wood, on the town's edge, has a formation nicknamed Cuttie's Hillock which produced the internationally known fossils called the Elgin Reptiles. In the Elgin district, boulders belonging to the lowest group of Jurassic strata, Oxford clay and chalk are found both in glacial deposits and on the surface of the ground. The largest of these deposits is at Linksfield, where limestone and shale lie on boulder clay. There is a large hill in Elgin's town centre, often viewed as the highlight of the Elgin tourist trail.

Climate
Elgin's climate is temperate maritime, with cool summers and relatively mild winters due to its proximity to the sea. Rainfall is quite low as it is in the rain shadow of mountains to the west and south-west.

Demography

Source: Moray Council from 2001 Census data
Elgin's population in 1901 was 8460

Economy

The Elgin–Forres–Lossiemouth triangle is heavily dependent on Royal Air Force stations for the employment of civilians. In 2005, RAF Lossiemouth along with its neighbour RAF Kinloss contributed £156.5 million (including civilian expenditure) to the Moray economy, of which £76.6 million was retained and spent locally. The bases provide, directly or indirectly, 21% of all employment in the area, although in 2010 the closure of RAF Kinloss had a significant effect on these numbers. Aware of the impact that the Air Force has on the area's economy, the local population instigated a long campaign to save RAF Lossiemouth, the future of which was also in doubt. How much of an influence this had upon the government's and Ministry of Defence's final decision is uncertain, but the base was ultimately saved and RAF Leuchars instead faced the axe as part of the same Strategic Defence and Security Review. RAF Leuchars will now become, like RAF Kinloss, an army base. Other areas offering significant employment are local authority, construction and real estate, food and drink, tourism, transport, business services and wholesale/retail.

Whisky is an important component of the wider local economy, with Glen Moray distillery, Miltonduff distillery and the BenRiach distillery all within six miles of Elgin.

In a recent study, Elgin was shown to be one of the most expensive towns in which to buy property in Scotland.

Politics

National governments
Elgin is in the Moray (Westminster) constituency of the United Kingdom Parliament which returns a Member of Parliament (MP) to the House of Commons, currently Douglas Ross of the Scottish Conservatives. 

Elgin is in the Moray constituency of the Scottish Parliament which has slightly different boundaries to the UK Parliament constituency of the same name. The constituency returns a Member of the Scottish Parliament (MSP) to Holyrood—currently Richard Lochhead of the SNP—and is part of the Highlands and Islands electoral region.

Local government
 see also List of Provosts of Elgin
 see also 2017 Moray Council election

Following the reorganisation of local government in Scotland, Elgin now has two multi-member wards, each with three councillors. These wards are Elgin North and Elgin South.

City status 
Elgin has bid to become a city as part of The Queen’s Platinum Jubilee celebrations in 2022. The last Scottish town to become a city was Perth in 2012.

Transport
Elgin is situated on the A96 trunk route which connects the cities of Aberdeen and Inverness. Heavy traffic through the town causes serious congestion. Scottish transport minister Tavish Scott visited the town in August 2006 to look at the traffic management problems and to meet campaigners for a bypass. It is estimated that a bypass would remove about one-third of traffic from Elgin's streets. The A941 runs from Lossiemouth through Elgin to Rothes, Craigellachie, Dufftown and Rhynie.

Elgin railway station is operated by ScotRail. The railway also connects to Aberdeen and Inverness which have trains to other UK destinations.

Elgin's bus station is located adjacent to the St Giles Centre and is operated mainly by Stagecoach. It provides services within Elgin and to other local towns as well as to Aberdeen and Inverness.

The nearest airports are Inverness Airport, which has flights to mainly UK destinations, and Aberdeen Airport which has UK and international flights.

Education

Nursery schools
 Ark Childcare, Mosstowie
 Jack 'n' Jill Pre-School Centre, Kinder House, 22 Wardend Place, New Elgin
 Moray Leisure Centre Pre-School Nursery, Borough Briggs Road, Elgin
 Magic Roundabout Pre-School Nursery, Thornhill Drive, Elgin
St Sylvesters Nursery
Bishopmill Nursery
Seafield Nursery
Liberty Kids

Primary schools
 Aberlour House
 Bishopmill Primary School, Morriston Road, Bishopmill
 East End Primary School, Institution Road
 Greenwards Primary School, Edgar Road, New Elgin
 New Elgin Primary School, Bezack Street, New Elgin
 Seafield Primary School, Deanshaugh Terrace, Bishopmill
 West End Primary School, Mayne Road
 St Sylvester's RC Primary School, Abbey Street
 Linkwood Primary School

Secondary schools
 Elgin Academy, Morriston Road, Bishopmill
 Elgin High School, High School Drive, New Elgin
 Gordonstoun, Gordonstoun Road, Elgin

Further education
 Moray College, Moray Street, Elgin

Community care

Hospitals
 Dr Gray's Hospital

Health centres
 The Maryhill Health Centre.
 Linkwood Medical at the Glassgreen Centre (Formerly the Victoria Crescet Medical Centre before its relocation in 2009)
 Elgin Community Surgery, Highfield House.

Hospice
 The Oaks Hospice, Sherrifmill

Religion
The following denominations have places of worship in Elgin:

Church of Scotland
 St Giles', High Street
 St Columba's South, Moss Street
 Birnie Kirk
 Elgin High, North Guildry Street
Free Church of Scotland
 Free Church, South Street
Baptist Union of Scotland
 Elgin Baptist Church, Reidhaven Street
Roman Catholic Church
 St Sylvester's, Institution Road
 Greyfriars Sisters of Mercy Convent in Elgin
Scottish Episcopal Church
 Holy Trinity, Trinity Place
Other denominations
 The Church of Jesus Christ of Latter-day Saints, Pansport Road
 Jehovah's Witnesses, Linkwood
 Calvary Christian Life Centre, Lesmurdie Road
 True Jesus Church, Lesmurdie Road
 Pentecostal Church of God, New Elgin Hall Annex
 Brethren, Riverside Gospel Hall, North Street
 Oasis Church COTN, The Hub, Tyock Industrial Estate
 Elgin Mosque, 1 Gordon Street.

Culture and leisure
 Elgin Museum, 1 High Street
 Elgin Library, Cooper Park
 Elgin Golf Club, Hardhillock, Birnie Road
 Glassgreen Golf Range, Birnie Road
 Cooper Park: boating, pitch and putt, tennis
 Biblical Gardens
 Moray Leisure Centre, Borough Briggs Road, containing swimming pool, ice rink and a gymnasium
Moray Sports Centre, Linkwood
 Town Hall with auditorium for production of shows
 Community Centre, Trinity Road: badminton
 The Lantern Gallery, 18 South Guildry Street
 Red Shoes Theatre and music venue, High Street
 Elgin Youth Café, Francis Place
 Moray Jazz Club, ground floor of the Elgin City Football Club, Borough Briggs Road
 Dandy Lion statue, the Plainstones

Music
During the 1960s, the Beatles, the Who, Pink Floyd, Cream and Dusty Springfield all performed at the Two Red Shoes dancehall, and The Kinks played Elgin Town Hall. Oi Polloi performed at the Ocean Club on Batchen Street in April 2007, under a gazebo erected by local punks.

Sport
In August 2021, a new community sports facility consisting of a full-size football pitch and two enclosed five-a-side pitches was opened.

Football
Formed in 1893, the town's only senior football club is Elgin City, who play at Borough Briggs stadium. They entered the Highland Football League in 1895 and won the league championship fourteen times. The club entered the Scottish Football League in season 2000–01 and currently competes in Division Two. Their home colours are black and white vertical stripes, black shorts and white socks. Past famous players for Elgin City include Andy Goram, Nicky Walker, Jimmy Johnstone and John McGinlay. Recently ex-Scotland players Brian Irvine and David Robertson have managed the club.

Two junior football sides, Bishopmill United and New Elgin, both currently compete in the Scottish Junior Football North Division Two while Moray Social, Golden Pheasant F.C. and Bishopmill Villa participate in the Moray District Welfare Football Association.

Rugby union
Moray RFC was established in 1923 and play their home games at Morriston Playing Fields.

Cricket
Elgin Cricket Club plays home games on the Cooper Park cricket pitch under the auspices of North of Scotland Cricket Association.

Ice hockey
Elgin is home to the Moray Typhoons, an SNL team. They play their home games at the Moray Leisure Centre.

Roller derby
The Helgin roller derby team trains regularly in Elgin.

Twin town
  Landshut in Bavaria, Germany, since 1956

Notable people

13th to 17th centuries
 William Wiseman, nobleman and Sheriff of Elgin. Ancestor of Capel Wiseman of Hertfordshire (1635–1683), Bishop of the Dromore Diocese (County Down) of the Church of Ireland, who was forced to flee to the Continent following the accession of James II in 1685.

18th century
 Alexander Brodie Spark (1792–1856), banker and merchant

19th century
 Lt William Rennie, (1822–1887), Victoria Cross recipient
 Mary Ann Maitland (1839–1919), author
 Sir David Hardie (1856–1945), Australian medical practitioner
 John Grant (1876–1961), bagpipe musician and composer
 Margaret Hasluck MBE (1885–1947), author and anthropologist
 James Low (1894–1960), footballer
 Masataka Taketsuru (1894–1979), Japanese whisky distiller

20th century
 Frederick Fyvie Bruce (1910–1990), usually cited as F. F. Bruce, theologian
 Archbishop Mario Conti (1934-2022), Roman Catholic Archbishop Emeritus of Glasgow, Scotland
 Leslie Benzies (born 1971), video game designer and producer 
 Joe Lennon (born 1940), Musician
 Kevin McKidd (born 1973), actor, director, and singer
 Steven Pressley (born 1973), former international footballer and former manager of Carlisle United 
 Lesley Souter (1917–1981), first female electrical engineer from the University of Glasgow
 Chris Clark (born 1980), footballer
 Richard Foster (born 1985), footballer

Notes

External links
 Elgin census data
 Elgin Museum
 Engraving of Elgin in 1693 by John Slezer at National Library of Scotland

 
Towns in Moray
County towns in Scotland
Former cities in Scotland
Royal burghs